Goniaeola is a genus of picture-winged flies in the family Ulidiidae.

Species
Goniaeola foveolata Hendel 1909

References

Ulidiidae
Brachycera genera
Taxa named by Friedrich Georg Hendel